Luis Scally (26 June 1915 – 8 July 1994) was an Argentine field hockey player. He competed in the men's tournament at the 1948 Summer Olympics.

References

External links
 

1915 births
1994 deaths
Argentine male field hockey players
Olympic field hockey players of Argentina
Field hockey players at the 1948 Summer Olympics
Field hockey players from Buenos Aires